Kameraflage is a patented (US Patent #8,531,308) context-sensitive display technology developed by Connor Dickie.

It adds a second camera-specific layer of information to scenes which are invisible to the human eye, but will register in the silicon chips found in digital cameras. Since digital cameras receive a broader spectrum of light than human eyes, the technology is invisible to the naked eye. One example of its use is subtitling in films: the subtitles can be rendered viewable only when using the viewfinder of a digital camera, allowing the subtitles to be optionally viewed by the audience.

The technology was demonstrated at the 2006 Paris Fashion Week, worn by model Anina. It was also shown at the 2007 ACM SIGGRAPH Unravel fashion show in San Diego, California, and at the 2011 CES Technology Fashion show.

Kameraflage placed 6th out of 100 in textile innovations for 2008 by the Thailand Textile Institute.

References

External links

Connor Dickie's Blog

Display technology companies